Simhada Mari Sainya is a 1981 Indian Kannada language children's film directed by Rajendra Singh Babu. It stars Arjun Sarja (credited as Master Arjun Sarja), Amrish Puri and Baby Rekha. The supporting cast features an ensemble of other child actors and top Kannada stars. It won two awards at the 1981–82 Karnataka State Film Awards — Best Editor (K. Balu) and Best Female Child Actor (Baby Rekha). The film is notable for a scene that involves Arjun Sarja clinging onto a helicopter hovering at a height of 500 feet above the ground (thereby, featuring his film debut on-screen as a junior artist).

Plot 
A group of children, led by James and Arjun, journey into a forest to rescue the two daughters of their friend's sisters kidnapped by an evil man played by Amrish Puri.

Cast 

 Arjun Sarja 
 Amrish Puri
 Jayanthi
 Manjula in cameo 
 Dwarakish in cameo 
 Shivaram in cameo 
 Master Bhanuprakash
 Master B. R. Prasanna Kumar
 Baby Indira
 Sundar Krishna Urs
 Dinesh
 Fighter Shetty
 Baby Rekha
 Master Arjun

Soundtrack

Chellapilla Satyam composed the background score and the music for the soundtracks in the album.

References 

1981 films
1980s Kannada-language films
Films directed by Rajendra Singh Babu
Films scored by Satyam (composer)
Indian children's films
1980s children's films